HPD may refer to:
 4-Hydroxyphenylpyruvate dioxygenase
 Hematoporphyrin, organic compound
 Histrionic personality disorder
 Honda Performance Development
 HPD series of mines, landmines
 New York City Department of Housing Preservation and Development
 Croatian Climbing Society (Hrvatsko planinarsko društvo, HPD)

Transport
 Haripad railway station, Kerala, India
 Haripur Band railway station, Punjab, Pakistan
 Harpenden railway station, Hertfordshire, England (National Rail station code)

US police departments
 Hagerstown Police Department (Maryland)
 Hempstead Village Police Department, in New York
 Henderson Police Department in Nevada
 Hialeah Police Department, in Florida
 Hillsboro Police Department (Oregon)
 Hollywood Police Department (Florida)
 Holyoke Police Department, in Massachusetts
 Honolulu Police Department in Hawaii
 Hoonah Police Department, in Alaska
 Houston Police Department in Texas